Qaleh-ye Mazban (also Romanized as Qal‘eh-ye Mazbān; also known as Qal‘eh-ye Marzbān) is a village in Veys Rural District, Veys District, Bavi County, Khuzestan Province, Iran. At the 2006 census, its population was 360, consisting of 64 families.

References 

Populated places in Bavi County